Liz Barclay (born c. 1954) is a British-based Northern Irish broadcaster, journalist and writer.

Career
Barclay was born and brought up in Northern Ireland. Her early career was as a financial advisor and manager at the Citizens' Advice Bureau where she worked from 1985 to 1991. Her first job in radio was at the BBC where she was taken on as a researcher and producer in the Continuing Education department. She has been a presenter of You and Yours, the consumer affairs programme. She is a freelance presenter specialising in personal finance and small business.

She is the author of books on Sir Philip Green and Duncan Bannatyne. She writes a consumer affairs column for the Independent on Sunday. She is also a lay member of the NHS Equality and Diversity Council.

On Tuesday 7 August 2018, while on the panel of the debate show The Wright Stuff on  Channel 5, she referred to the current accusations against the Labour Party of anti-Semitism as an issue "very difficult to understand".

She has been the UK's Small Business Commissioner since 1 July 2021.

References

External links
BBC - Radio 4 - Presenter - Liz Barclay
BBC - Radio 4 You and Yours - Presenters - Liz Barclay

1950s births
BBC newsreaders and journalists
British journalists
Living people
Journalists from Northern Ireland